Pendle Hill is a hill in Lancashire, England.

Pendle Hill may also refer to:
Pendle Hill (China, Maine), a historic house
Pendle Hill, New South Wales, a suburb of Sydney, Australia
Pendle Hill railway station
Pendle Hill Quaker Center for Study and Contemplation, a study centre in Wallingford, Pennsylvania, United States

See also
 Pendle (disambiguation)